Werner Guballa (October 30, 1944 – February 27, 2012) was the Roman Catholic titular bishop of Catrum and auxiliary bishop of the Roman Catholic Diocese of Mainz, Germany.

Ordained to the priesthood in 1977, Guballa was named auxiliary bishop in 2003, and died while still in office.

Notes

1944 births
2012 deaths
German Roman Catholic titular bishops
Auxiliary bishops